The 2016 South Carolina Republican presidential primary took place on February 20 in the U.S. state of South Carolina, marking the Republican Party's third nominating contest in their series of presidential primaries ahead of the 2016 presidential election.

The Democratic Party held its Nevada caucuses on the same day, while their South Carolina primary would only take place a week later on February 27.

The states delegates are allocated in this way: 29 delegates are awarded to the winner of the primary; 3 delegates are awarded to the winner of each of the seven congressional districts.

Following a poor result in the primary, Jeb Bush announced the suspension of his campaign.

Forums and debates
January 9, 2016 – Columbia, South Carolina 
The Kemp Forum was held in the Columbia Metropolitan Convention Center by the Jack Kemp Foundation. Bush, Carson, Christie, Fiorina, Huckabee, Kasich, and Rubio attended. The forum was moderated by Speaker of the House Paul Ryan and Senator Tim Scott.

January 14, 2016 – North Charleston, South Carolina

On December 8, 2015, it was announced that Fox Business Network would host an additional debate two days after the State of the Union address. The debate was held in the North Charleston Coliseum in North Charleston, South Carolina. The anchor and managing editor of Business News, Neil Cavuto, and anchor and global markets editor, Maria Bartiromo, reprised their roles as moderators for the prime-time debate, which began at 9 p.m. EST. The earlier debate, which started at 6 p.m. EST, was again moderated by anchors Trish Regan and Sandra Smith.

On December 22, 2015, Fox Business Network announced that in order to qualify for the prime-time debate, candidates had to either: place in the top six nationally, based on an average of the five most recent national polls recognized by FOX News; place in the top five in Iowa, based on an average of the five most recent Iowa state polls recognized by FOX News; or place in the top five in New Hampshire, based on an average of the five most recent New Hampshire state polls recognized by FOX News. In order to qualify for the first debate, candidates must have registered at least one percent in one of the five most recent national polls.

On January 11, 2016, seven candidates were revealed to have been invited to the prime-time debate: Jeb Bush, Ben Carson, Chris Christie, Ted Cruz, John Kasich, Marco Rubio, and Donald Trump. The participants were introduced in order of their poll rankings at the debate.

Carly Fiorina, Mike Huckabee, and Rick Santorum participated in the undercard debate.  Rand Paul was also invited to the undercard debate, but said, "I won't participate in anything that's not first tier because we have a first tier campaign." The candidates were introduced in order of their poll rankings. The first question was to assess the economy. The next questions asked Fiorina about the role of the US in the world, Santorum about the Iran deal, and Huckabee about the solution to Afghanistan's problems.

February 13, 2016 – Greenville, South Carolina
The ninth debate, and second debate in the month of February, was held in another early primary state of South Carolina, and aired on CBS News. The debate was moderated by John Dickerson in the Peace Center, began at 9 p.m. ET and lasted for 90 minutes.

Endorsements

Polling

Aggregate polls

Results
Primary date: February 20, 2016
District conventions: April 2016
State convention: May 7, 2016
National delegates: 50

Exit Polls

Analysis 
Donald Trump won the South Carolina primary by ten points. He carried the crucial Evangelical vote with 33% to Cruz at 27% and Rubio at 22%.  Many pundits were perplexed by Trump's dominance among culturally conservative Southern whites who were expected to view him as immoral, but he benefitted from voters' racial, cultural, and economic angst that mattered more than shared values.

Marco Rubio, who enjoyed the endorsement of Governor Nikki Haley, came in second in the primary. Rubio won the two urban counties of Richland and Charleston, both of which have a higher percentage of college-educated voters.

References

South Carolina
Republican presidential primary
2016
February 2016 events in the United States